UNT or Unt may refer to:
 Unt (surname), an Estonian-language surname
  ("A New Era"), a political party in Venezuela
  (disambiguation), national trade union federations in several countries
 , a radical Islamic political party in Chad
 , a national university in Argentina
 University of North Texas, a state university in Denton, Texas
 Unt, abbreviation for unniltrium, another name for chemical element 103, Lawrencium
 , a Swedish newspaper